is a 1977 Japanese film directed by Masahiro Shinoda. Its alternate English-language titles are Banished Orin and Symphony in Gray.

It details the life of a goze, a blind female minstrel (played by Shima Iwashita, the director's wife), in early 20th-century Japan.

Cast
Shima Iwashita as Orin
Yoshio Harada as Heitarō - Big Man
Tomoko Naraoka as Teruyo
Taiji Tonoyama as Charcoal Man
Tōru Abe as Bessho
Jun Hamamura as Saito

Awards and nominations
2nd Hochi Film Award 
 Won: Best  Actress - Shima Iwashita

References

External links
 
 

1977 films
Films directed by Masahiro Shinoda
1970s Japanese-language films
Films set in the Taishō period
1970s Japanese films